The Twin Candlestick Islets are islets in Jinshan District, New Taipei, Taiwan.

History
The islets were once part of Jinshan Cape. Due to the continuous movement of tectonics plates and coastal erosion, they separated from the island of Taiwan. Initially they were a single rock arch, but the top collapsed thus made them look like two candlesticks.

Geology
The islets are located 450 meters off the coast of Jinshan Cape. The highest elevation of the islets is 60 meters.

See also
 List of islands of Taiwan

References

Islands of Taiwan
Landforms of New Taipei